Maj. Walter Torrie Forrest  (14 November 1880 – ) was a Scottish rugby union player and British Army officer who was killed in World War I.

Forrest was born in Kelso, Roxburghshire, to George Forrest, a celebrated fishing rod master and tackle maker, and Margaret Torrie Forest.

He went on to play in every game for Scotland for the remainder of 1903 and 1904 rugby seasons, in which Scotland were the Home Nations winner, and against  and Wales in 1905. After eight caps, a collarbone injury ended his international career in 1905, but he continued to play for his team in Kelso.

Prior to the war, Forrest served in the Territorial Force. He was commissioned as a second lieutenant in the 1st Roxburgh and Selkirk Volunteer Ride Corps in 1906, and given the same precedence in the King's Own Scottish Borderers in 1908. During the First World War, he participated in the Gallipoli campaign and was then sent to Palestine, where he was awarded the Military Cross in 1916. The award was gazetted with the following citation:
 

In April 1917, Forrest was killed in the Second Battle of Gaza. He is buried at the Gaza War Cemetery.

References

External links
"An entire team wiped out by the Great War".  The Scotsman, 6 November 2009

1880 births
1917 deaths
Gallipoli campaign
Scottish military personnel
British Army personnel of World War I
British military personnel killed in World War I
Burials at Gaza War Cemetery
King's Own Scottish Borderers officers
Recipients of the Military Cross
Rugby union players from Kelso
Scotland international rugby union players
Scottish rugby union players
Territorial Force officers